Colopterus maculatus is a species of sap-feeding beetle in the family Nitidulidae. It is found in North America.

References

 Grouvelle, A. / Schenkling, S., ed. (1913). "Pars 56: Byturidae, Nitidulidae". Coleopterorum Catalogus, 223.
 Parsons, Carl T. (1943). "A revision of Nearctic Nitidulidae (Coleoptera)". Bulletin of the Museum of Comparative Zoology, vol. 92, no. 3, 121–278.
 Price, Michele B., and Daniel K. Young (2006). "An annotated checklist of Wisconsin sap and short-winged flower beetles (Coleoptera: Nitidulidae, Kateretidae)". Insecta Mundi, vol. 20, no. 1–2, 69–84.

Further reading

 Arnett, R.H. Jr., M. C. Thomas, P. E. Skelley and J. H. Frank. (eds.). (2002). American Beetles, Volume II: Polyphaga: Scarabaeoidea through Curculionoidea. CRC Press LLC, Boca Raton, FL.
 Arnett, Ross H. (2000). American Insects: A Handbook of the Insects of America North of Mexico. CRC Press.
 Richard E. White. (1983). Peterson Field Guides: Beetles. Houghton Mifflin Company.

Nitidulidae